KVRV (97.7 FM, "The River") is a commercial radio station licensed to Monte Rio, California, broadcasting to the Santa Rosa, California area.

KVRV airs a classic rock music format branded as "The River" (a local reference to the Russian River). Their studios are in Santa Rosa.

External links
KVRV official website

Mass media in Sonoma County, California
VRV
Classic rock radio stations in the United States